Cliff "Chief" Walton was an American Negro league shortstop between 1916 and 1921.

Walton made his Negro leagues debut in 1916 with the Chicago Giants. He went on to play for the Pittsburgh Keystones and the Homestead Grays in 1921.

References

External links
Baseball statistics and player information from Baseball-Reference Black Baseball Stats and Seamheads

Year of birth missing
Year of death missing
Place of birth missing
Place of death missing
Chicago Giants players
Homestead Grays players
Pittsburgh Keystones players
Baseball shortstops